Daniel Šmejkal (born 28 August 1970) is a Czech former football midfielder and manager of FC Sellier & Bellot Vlašim. He played for the Czech Republic national team, for whom he played a total of 10 matches and scored 3 goals.

References

External links 
 
 

1970 births
Living people
Czech Republic international footballers
Czech footballers
Czech First League players
Bundesliga players
Association football forwards
SK Slavia Prague players
Dukla Prague footballers
FC Viktoria Plzeň players
Sportspeople from Plzeň
Czech First League managers
Czech football managers
FK Teplice managers
FC Sellier & Bellot Vlašim managers
SK Slavia Prague non-playing staff
Association football coaches
Czech National Football League managers